Lisa Erin Schwartz (born April 4, 1983) is an American YouTube personality and actress. Her YouTube channel, Lisbug, has over 2.2 million subscribers. Schwartz starred in Not Cool (2014), the TV film My Profile Story (2012), and the ABC digital series This Isn't Working (2016). She provides the voice of Talking Angela in the Talking Tom and Friends web series, which has been broadcast on YouTube, television in various countries outside the United States and is running in its fifth season.

Career 
Schwartz began her YouTube channel, Lisbug, in April 2007.  She has since worked with Seventeen, Yahoo!, Maker Studios, and appeared in YouTube personality and director Shane Dawson's 2014 film, Not Cool. With Dawson, she also advocated against cyberbullying.

She is also the voice of Talking Angela in the Talking Tom and Friends animated series and on February 2, 2016, celebrated her character's birthday. She is the co-creator of and actress in the Maker Studios and New Form Productions original series Party Girl.

In September 2016, Schwartz announced that she created a show called This Isn't Working with ABC Digital. She plays the lead role of Sarah Turner, who works in temporary jobs to support her career dream as an actress.

Publications 
On August 27, 2019, Schwartz released her first memoir, Thirty-Life Crisis: Navigating My Thirties, One Drunk Baby Shower at a Time. Its foreword was written by Shane Dawson. Schwartz promoted the book at a Barnes & Noble at The Grove at Farmers Market in Los Angeles. The book promotes itself as a "hilarious essay collection perfect for anyone dealing with the challenges, indignities, and celebrations that come with being a thirty-something".

Personal life 
Schwartz dated YouTube personality Shane Dawson from December 2011 to 2015. Schwartz is Jewish. Her mother's name is Jennifer and her grandmother's name is Virginia, and both appear in the Elders React series by Fine Brothers Entertainment. In November 2019, Schwartz announced on her YouTube channel that she got engaged to comedian Jeff Galante. On November 8, 2021, she married Galante in a small ceremony. In June 2020, a video resurfaced of her and Shane Dawson making inappropriate jokes about Dawson's cousin, who was 12 at the time. Both she and Shane received backlash and Schwartz issued an apology the same day.

Filmography

Film

Television

References

External links 
 
 

Living people
American YouTubers
People from Tarzana, Los Angeles
21st-century American actresses
Jewish American actresses
Jewish American female comedians
American women comedians
1983 births
Comedians from California
21st-century American comedians
21st-century American Jews